Schizolaena gereaui is a plant in the family Sarcolaenaceae. It is endemic to Madagascar. The specific epithet is for the botanist Roy Emile Gereau.

Description
Its subcoriaceous leaves are elliptic to obovate in shape and coloured chocolate brown above and khaki brown below. The inflorescences have one to three flowers, each with five petals.

Distribution and habitat
Schizolaena gereaui is known only from the eastern regions of Sava, Atsimo-Atsinanana, Vatovavy-Fitovinany, Atsinanana and Anosy. Its habitat is humid forest from sea-level to about  altitude. Some subpopulations of the species are in protected areas.

References

gereaui
Endemic flora of Madagascar
Plants described in 1999